ZeroZeroZero is an original soundtrack album by Scottish post-rock band Mogwai, released on 1 May 2020 on Rock Action Records.  Due to the COVID-19 pandemic, it was released initially in a download only format via Bandcamp, and for the first week on a pay-what-you-want basis.  50% of the first week's income for the record is to be donated to charities including Help Musicians and various NHS charities.

The music was composed for ZeroZeroZero, an Italian crime drama television series based on the book of the same name by Roberto Saviano.

Track listing

Personnel
Mogwai
 Stuart Braithwaite – guitar, vocals
 Dominic Aitchison – bass guitar
 Barry Burns – guitar, piano, synthesizer 
 Martin Bulloch - drums

Charts

References

Mogwai soundtracks
2020 soundtrack albums
Rock Action Records albums